The Rallye des Pharaons (French for "Pharaohs Rally") was a rally-raid event that took place in Egypt between 1982 and 2015. It was similar in format to the Dakar Rally in that it took place in desert conditions and cars, trucks, and motorcycles were all permitted to compete.

History
The first Pharaohs Rally was held in 1982 from an idea of Jean-Claude Morellet. In 1998 the organization was taken over by JVD, a company managed by Jacky Ickx, Vincenzo Lancia and Daniele Cotto, and the name was changed to Pharaons International Cross Country Rally.

The competition is valid for the FIM Cross-Country Rallies World Championship since 2000 and for the FIA Cross-Country Rally World Cup since 2005.

Tragedy struck on September 29, 2004, when three-time Dakar Rally winner Richard Sainct was killed when his motorcycle ran off the course. KTM, who Sainct rode for, pulled all other factory racers from the rest of the rally in respect for Sainct.

2015 marked the last year that the event was run due to difficulties in receiving support from the FIA and the Egyptian government.
Rally des Pharaons restarted in 1998 after it wasn't held for 1 year in 1997 under the name of Rally of Egypt with joint organisation of Siag Travel with JVD and has stayed with this name in 1998-1999-2001-2002, and then JVD changed the name to Rally des Pharaons crosscountry.

Winners

References

External links 
 Rallye des Pharaons Website

 
Rally raid races
Motorsport in Egypt
Cross Country Rally World Cup races